Arjun Bhati (born 7 September 2004) is an Indian amateur golfer. He is from Greater Noida, won the FCG Callaway Junior World Golf Championships 2019. He is a golf prodigy, an amateur golfer. 40 countries and 637 golfers had participated in the tournament. Arjun secured the first position with 199 strokes in the three-day final.

Arjun Bhati is an emerging champion of Indian golf history, he has won Junior World Golf Championships 2018. Arjun has won several championships in various world golf tournaments.

Arjun was in the news for donating ₹4.30 lakhs to the PM-CARES relief fund, which he raised by selling 102 trophies he had been awarded.

References

External links
Arjun Bhati wins Junior World Golf Championship
सिगापुर गोल्फ चैंपियनशिप में अर्जुन व आर्यन को पहला स्थान
Arjun Bhati News in Hindi, Arjun Bhati की लेटेस्ट न्यूज़, photos, videos
Arjun Bhati wins US Kids Jr Golf World Championship
ओलंपिक स्वर्ण है 12 साल के अर्जुन का लक्ष्य
India's Arjun Bhati wins Junior World Golf Championship
Arjun Bhati wins US Kids Jr Golf World Championship
Greater Noida’s Arjun Bhati wins Junior World Golf Championship

Indian male golfers
Sportspeople from Noida
2004 births
Living people